The 1997 World Single Distance Speed Skating Championships were held between 7 and 9 March 1997 in the Tor Stegny, Warsaw, Poland.

Schedule

Medal summary

Men's events

Women's events

Medal table

References

1997 World Single Distance
World Single Distance Speed Skating Championships
World Single Distance, 1997
Sports competitions in Warsaw
World Single Distance Speed Skating Championships
1990s in Warsaw